Trithemis imitata is a species of dragonfly in the family Libellulidae. It is found in the Democratic Republic of the Congo and Uganda. Its natural habitats are subtropical or tropical moist lowland forests and intermittent rivers.

References

imitata
Taxonomy articles created by Polbot
Insects described in 1961